Thomas George Smith (1851 – 16 December 1909) was an Australian football player. He was a foundation player of the  Football Club in 1870 and was also an inaugural player in the club's first SAFA season. During the first three seasons of the SAFA, he won 's best and fairest award.

Early life 
Thomas Smith was born in 1851 in Woolwich, England. His family brought him to Australia when he was three years old.

Football 
Thomas Smith was arguably the first star player for the Port Adelaide Football Club. He won three consecutive best and fairest for Port Adelaide during the first three years of the South Australian  Football Association (later SANFL) from 1877 to 1879.

On 29 May 1885 a football match on Adelaide Oval was organised by the SAFA between an All-Indigenous team captained by Harry Hewitt and a combined team selected by, then retired Port Adelaide player, Smith composed of players from Port Juniors, LeFevre Peninsula, Fitzroy and Kingston. The match was very close and ended in a draw.

Later life 
Outside of football Smith was a tailor who worked on Commercial Road Port Adelaide.

Personal life 
Thomas Smith was a cousin to Australian artist Mortimer Menpes.

References

1851 births
1909 deaths
Port Adelaide Football Club (SANFL) players
Port Adelaide Football Club players (all competitions)
English emigrants to Australia
Date of birth missing
Date of death missing
English players of Australian rules football